Hastulopsis is a genus of sea snails, marine gastropod molluscs in the family Terebridae, the auger snails.

Species
Species within the genus Hastulopsis include:
 Hastulopsis baliensis Terryn & Dekker, 2017
 Hastulopsis blanda (Deshayes, 1859)
 Hastulopsis cebuensis Gargiulo, 2014
 Hastulopsis elialae (Aubry, 1994)
 Hastulopsis gotoensis (E.A. Smith, 1879)
 Hastulopsis loisae (E.A. Smith, 1903)
 Hastulopsis maestratii Terryn & Rosado, 2011
 Hastulopsis marmorata (Deshayes, 1859)
 Hastulopsis masirahensis Terryn & Rosado, 2016
 Hastulopsis melanacme (E.A. Smith, 1873)
 Hastulopsis mirbatensis Terryn & Rosado, 2016
 Hastulopsis suspensa (E.A. Smith, 1904)
 Hastulopsis whiteheadae (Aubry & Marquet, 1995)

 Species brought into synonymy
 Hastulopsis alvelolata (Hinds, 1844): synonym of Maculauger alveolatus (Hinds, 1844)
 Hastulopsis alveolata (Hinds, 1844): synonym of Maculauger alveolatus (Hinds, 1844)
 Hastulopsis amoena (Deshayes, 1859): synonym of Myurella amoena (Deshayes, 1859)
 Hastulopsis bilineata (Aubry, 2004): synonym of Myurella bilineata (Sprague, 2004)
 Hastulopsis burchi (Bratcher & Cernohorsky, 1982): synonym of Myurella burchi (Bratcher & Cernohorsky, 1982)
 Hastulopsis campbelli (Burch, 1965): synonym of Maculauger campbelli (R. D. Burch, 1965)
 Hastulopsis castigata (A. H. Cooke, 1885): synonym of Maculauger castigatus (A. H. Cooke, 1885)
 Hastulopsis conspersa (Hinds, 1844): synonym of Myurella conspersa (Hinds, 1844)
 Hastulopsis gotoensis (E.A. Smith, 1961): synonym of Hastulopsis gotoensis (E.A. Smith, 1879)
 Hastulopsis hindsi (Deshayes, 1857): synonym of Hastulopsis conspersa (Hinds, 1844)
 Hastulopsis mindanaoensis Aubry, 2008: synonym of Myurella mindanaoensis (Aubry, 2008)
 Hastulopsis minipulchra (Bozzetti, 2008): synonym of Maculauger minipulcher (Bozzetti, 2008)
 Hastulopsis pertusa (Born, 1778): synonym of Myurella pertusa (Born, 1778)
 Hastulopsis pseudopertusa (Bratcher & Cernohorsky, 1985): synonym of Maculauger kokiy Pacaud & Lesport, 2020
 Hastulopsis turrita (E.A. Smith, 1873): synonym of Punctoterebra turrita (E. A. Smith, 1873)

References

 Oyama K. (1961). On some new facts of the taxonomy of Terebridae. Venus. 21(2): 176-189.
 Terryn Y. (2007). Terebridae: A Collectors Guide. Conchbooks & NaturalArt. 59pp + plates.

External links
 Fedosov, A. E.; Malcolm, G.; Terryn, Y.; Gorson, J.; Modica, M. V.; Holford, M.; Puillandre, N. (2020). Phylogenetic classification of the family Terebridae (Neogastropoda: Conoidea). Journal of Molluscan Studies

Terebridae